Frederick III, Duke of Saxe-Gotha-Altenburg (14 April 1699 – 10 March 1772), was a duke of Saxe-Gotha-Altenburg.

Biography
He was born in Gotha, the eldest son of Frederick II, Duke of Saxe-Gotha-Altenburg and Magdalene Augusta of Anhalt-Zerbst.

After the death of his father, in 1732, Frederick III assumed the duchy of Saxe-Gotha-Altenburg.

In 1734 he began a flourishing soldier trade with the Emperor, to the Prince of Waldeck and to the King of Prussia, which put him into the position to create a tax in his own duchy. The duchy had to suffer for Frederick with difficulty in the Seven Years' War and he forced the duchy into a war with his neighbour, duke Anton Ulrich of Saxe-Meiningen (The "Wasunger War").

Issue
In Gotha on 17 September 1729, Frederick married Luise Dorothea of Saxe-Meiningen, his first cousin. They had nine children:
 Frederick Louis, Hereditary Prince of Saxe-Gotha-Altenburg (b. Gotha, 20 January 1735 – d. Gotha, 9 June 1756).
 Louis (b. Gotha, 25 October 1735 – d. Gotha, 26 October 1735).
 stillborn son (Gotha, 25 October 1735), twin of Louis.
 stillborn twin sons (1739).
 Fredericka Louise (b. Gotha, 30 January 1741 – d. Gotha, 5 February 1776).
 Ernest II, Duke of Saxe-Gotha-Altenburg (b. Gotha, 30 January 1745 – d. Gotha, 20 April 1804).
 Sophie (b. Gotha, 9 March 1746 – d. Gotha, 30 March 1746).
 August (b. Gotha, 14 August 1747 – d. Gotha, 28 September 1806).

From 1748 to 1755 he was regent of the duchy of Saxe-Weimar-Eisenach on behalf of Ernst August II Konstantin. From 1750, he acted as regent alongside his kinsmen Franz Josias, Duke of Saxe-Coburg-Saalfeld. He died in Gotha, aged 72.

Ancestors

References 

 
  Christian Ferdinand Schulze, Leben des Herzogs von Sachsen-Gotha und Altenburg Friedrich II., Digitaliat

|-

1699 births
1772 deaths
House of Saxe-Gotha-Altenburg
Knights of the Garter
People from Saxe-Gotha-Altenburg
People from Gotha (town)
Dukes of Saxe-Gotha-Altenburg
Recipients of the Order of the White Eagle (Poland)